Asadullah Bhutto is an incumbent Ameer of Jamaat-e-Islami Sindh. He belongs to the Bhutto tribe of Sindh

Political career
Bhutto is a lawyer by profession. He completed his LL.B in 1969 and Masters in Sociology in 1974 from University of Sindh. Bhutto has been a member of Pakistan Bar Association for 33 years and Human Rights Network of Pakistan for four years. He has traveled to Iran and Afghanistan.

References

External links
Official Jamaat-e-Islami Pakistan website
Biography of Moulana Asadullah Bhutto

Living people
Jamaat-e-Islami Pakistan politicians
Sindhi people
Year of birth missing (living people)